"Far Gone and Out" is a song by Scottish alternative rock group the Jesus and Mary Chain, released as the second single from their fourth studio album, Honey's Dead (1992). It was released by Blanco y Negro Records in March 1992 and reached number 23 on the UK Single Chart. "Far Gone and Out" also peaked at number 88 on the Australian ARIA Singles Chart in May 1992.

Track listings
All tracks were written by Jim Reid and William Reid.

7-inch (NEG56)
 "Far Gone and Out" – 2:48
 "Why'd You Want Me?" – 3:12

12-inch (NEG56T)
 "Far Gone and Out" – 2:48
 "Sometimes" – 2:50
 "Why'd You Want Me?" – 3:12

12-inch (NEG56TB) box with insert and postcards
 "Far Gone and Out" – 2:48
 "Reverence" (Al Jourgensen mix) – 6:09
 "Sometimes" – 2:50
 "Why'd You Want Me?" – 3:12

CDS (NEG56CD) holographic disc
 "Far Gone and Out" – 2:52
 "Far Gone and Out" (Arc Weld mix) – 5:04
 "Why'd You Want Me?" – 3:13
 "Sometimes" – 2:51

Personnel
The Jesus and Mary Chain
 Jim Reid – vocals, guitar, production
 William Reid – guitar, production

Additional personnel
 Alan Moulder – engineering ("Far Gone and Out")
 Dick Meaney – engineering ("Sometimes", "Why'd You Want Me")
 Al Jourgensen – remixing (Al Jourgensen mix)
 George Drakoulias – remixing (Arc Weld mix)

Charts

References

The Jesus and Mary Chain songs
1992 singles
1992 songs
Blanco y Negro Records singles
Songs written by Jim Reid
Songs written by William Reid (musician)